The Greek state has systematically replaced geographical and topographic names of non-Greek origin with Greek names as part of a policy and ideology of Hellenization. The main objective of the initiative has been to assimilate or hide geographical or topographical names that were deemed foreign and divisive against Greek unity or considered to be "bad Greek". The names that were considered foreign were usually of Albanian, Slavic, and Turkish origin. Most of the name changes occurred in the Arvanite settlements in central Greece and, after the Balkan Wars, in the ethnically heterogeneous northern Greece. Place names of Greek origin were also renamed after names in Classical Greece.

The policy commenced after the independence of Greece from the Ottoman Empire in the early 1830s, after the territorial expanses of Greece and continued into the Greek Republic. To this day use of the old Albanian, Slavic, or Turkish placenames by authorities, organisations, and individuals is penalized under Greek law.

History
The area that is today Greece was inhabited by various peoples throughout history, and the country's toponyms reflect their diversity of origins. The hellenization of toponyms in Greece started soon after Greek independence. 
Many placenames in Greece of non-Greek origin were replaced by ancient names that were supposed to have some connection to the area.  For example, the ancient name of Piraeus was revived in the 19th century, after it had been called Drakos in Greek, Porto Leone in Venetian, and Aslan Limanı in Turkish for centuries, after the Piraeus Lion which stood there.

In 1909, the existence of large numbers of non Greek place names were a nuisance to the government. In 1909 the government-appointed commission on toponyms report that every one village in three in Greece (30% of the total) should have its name changed (of the 5,069 Greek villages, 1,500 were considered as "speaking a barbaric language".

During the Balkan Wars, Greece doubled its territory and population, but it brought various large non-Greek populations into its border. Notably were the Slavic speaking Orthodox, the mostly Turkish-speaking Muslims from Macedonia, the Muslim Albanians, Orthodox Arvanites and Aromanians in Epirus. After the Second Balkan War against Bulgaria in 1913 the majority of Slavic speaking Christians was transferred to Bulgaria as part of a population exchange agreement (Treaty of Neuilly) between the two countries. Moreover, after the end of Graeco-Turkish War and the subsequent Treaty of Lausanne and population exchange between Greece and Turkey, all Muslims except Western Thrace, were exchanged for all Orthodox in Turkey except for those in Istanbul. The villages of the exchanged populations (Bulgarians and Muslims) in Greece were resettled with Greeks from Asia Minor, and the Balkans (mainly from Bulgaria and Yugoslavia). By 1928, Greece's demography had drastically changed from the position in 1830: the country had turned into a nation-state, non-Greeks and most of the population spoke Greek. The Arvanites and Aromanians today mostly proclaim themselves as Greeks. After World War II the remaining Muslim Albanians were expelled due to collaboration activity and war crimes.

After the departure of Slav and Muslim populations in 1912-1926 the Greek government renamed many places with revived ancient names, local Greek-language names, or translations of the non-Greek names and non-Greek names were officially removed. Although the bulk of the population was Greek<ref>{{cite web |url=http://www.unix.gr/Macedonia/Vlasidis.htm |title=Recycling Propaganda: Remarks on Recent Reports on Greece's "Slav-Macedonian Minority" |author=Vlassis Vlasidis - Veniamin Karakostanoglou |url-status=dead |archive-url=https://web.archive.org/web/20160303205042/http://www.unix.gr/Macedonia/Vlasidis.htm |archive-date=2016-03-03 }}</ref> the renaming was considered a way to establish a collective ethnic consciousness. Several historical Greek names from Asia Minor were also introduced in the region mainly by the resettled refugees. Many Demotic Greek names were also replaced by a Katharevousa Greek form, usually different only morphologically. This process started in 1926 and continued into the 1960s.

Name changes by region
The older name forms of the renamed settlements were mainly of Greek, Slavic, Turkish, Aromanian or Albanian origin. Other names that were considered foreign were also of Frankish and Italian origins.http://pandektis.ekt.gr/dspace/handle/10442/4968/simple-search?query=%CE%A0%CF%84%CF%85%CF%87%CE%AF%CE%B1 https://greece.redblueguide.com/en/the-small-island-vido-in-corfu-do-you-know-it http://pandektis.ekt.gr/dspace/handle/10442/4968/simple-search?query=%CF%80%CF%8C%CF%81%CF%84%CE%BF+%CE%B3%CE%B5%CF%81%CE%BC%CE%B5%CE%BD%CF%8C According to ongoing research being carried out at the Institute of Neohellenic Research in Athens, between 1913 and 1996, the names of 4,413 settlements were legally changed in Greece. In each case, the renamings were recorded in the official Government Gazette.  The regional breakdown in renamings is: Macedonia: 1,805 renamings; Peloponnese: 827 renamings; Central Greece: 519 renamings; Thessaly: 487 renamings; Epirus: 454 renamings; Thrace: 98 renamings; Crete: 97 renamings; Aegean Islands: 79 renamings; Ionian Islands: 47 renamings.

Central Greece

Eastern Central Greece was home to the Arvanites, an Albanian speaking people who migrated to the area in the 14th century. Until the 19th century some parts of Attica and Boeotia was populated by Arvanites, many of the placenames were also Arvanite, after the establishment of Greece in 1830 most of the names have been changed, especially to names unused since antiquity, from Classical Greece.

Epirus
Epirus had a Greek majority population before annexation to Greece (1913), with minorities of Aromanians and Albanians. A part of the Albanian minority, known as Cham Albanians, resided in the coastal area and were expelled from the area after World War II by the EDES resistance group. An unknown number of Aromanians and Orthodox Albanians, in some sources called Arvanites, still live in the area, who today identify mostly as Greek. Particularly in the early 20th-century Albanian place names of Epirus have been systematically changed to Greek, thereby erasing the former Albanian presence in the landscape.

Greek region of Macedonia
Till 1912, the area had a very heterogeneous population consisting of Slavic, Turkish, Greek, Jews and Aromanians and Megleno-Romanians. Most of the geographical names were of non Greek origin, the Greek government planned to change this. Between 1913 and 1928 the Slavic names of hundreds of villages and towns were Hellenized by a Committee for the Changing of Names, which was charged by the Greek government with "the elimination of all the names which pollute and disfigure the beautiful appearance of our fatherland". Between 1912 (Balkan Wars) and  1928 (after the Population exchange between Greece and Turkey), the non Greek inhabitants were largely gone and instead of them Greek refugees from the Ottoman Empire settled in the area thereby changing its demography. Toponym changes in each modern prefecture are listed in,
Drama Prefecture
Florina Prefecture
Grevena Prefecture
Imathia Prefecture
Kavala Prefecture
Pella Prefecture
Pieria Prefecture
Xanthi Prefecture

Western Greece

Western Thrace
Since 1977 all Turkish village names of Western Thrace have been changed to Greek names. Western Thrace is home to a large Turkish minority.

 Other 

Banitsa → Vevi (1926)
Boimitsa → Axioupoli (1927)
Kailar → Ptolemaida (1927)
Khandak → Candia → Heraklion
Lamia → Zitouni → Lamia
Cydonia – Canea – Chania

See also
Prontuario dei nomi locali dell'Alto Adige, a massive renaming of German toponyms in the Austrian territory annexed by Italy after World War I (today's South Tyrol)
Commission for the Determination of Place Names, massive renaming of toponyms in the territory annexed by Poland after World War II

References

Further reading

Kyramargiou, E., Papakondylis, Y., Scalora, F., & Dimitropoulos, D. (2021). Changing the Map in Greece and Italy: Place-name Changes in the Nineteenth Century. The Historical Review/La Revue Historique'', 17, 205-250. doi:https://doi.org/10.12681/hr.27072

External links
 For a comprehensive list and database of place name changes in Greece (by settlement, date and year of change), see Institute for Neo Hellenic Research: Name Changes of Settlements in Greece
  List compiled by the Institute for Neohellenic Research

Geography of Greece
Greek nationalism
Greece
Greek culture
Place name etymologies
Former toponyms in Greece
Names of places in Greece
Society of Greece
Discrimination in Greece